Burstock is a village and civil parish in west Dorset, England,  south of Crewkerne. In the 2011 census the parish had 59 dwellings, 49 households and a population of 120.

In 1086 Burstock was recorded in the Domesday Book as 'Bureuuinestoch', meaning a farm ('stoc') owned by either 'Burgwine' (a man) or 'Burgwynn' (a woman). It had 12 households, 8 acres of meadow and 3 ploughlands. It was in Whitchurch Canonicorum Hundred, the lord was William Malbank and the tenant-in-chief was Earl Hugh of Chester.

Before the Dissolution of the Monasteries in the mid 16th century, Burstock was closely associated with the Cistercian monks at nearby Forde Abbey; at Whetham, in the north of the parish, the abbey developed a mill, and in 1316 the Abbot became Burstock's lord of the manor.

References

External links 

Villages in Dorset